Associazione Sportiva Dilettantistica Pianura was an Italian association football club located in Pianura, a suburb of Naples, Campania. The social colors are white and blue.

The team bankrupted in 2010.

External links
Official homepage

Association football clubs established in 1977
Defunct football clubs in Italy
Football clubs in Naples
1977 establishments in Italy
Association football clubs disestablished in 2010
2010 disestablishments in Italy